Association Sportive Excelsior Football, is a sport club from Papeete, Tahiti. The club has football and tennis sections . The football team on several titles in the Tahitian football, mainly in the decades of 1950 and 1960. Today, they compete in the Tahiti Ligue 2 the second tier of the football system in Tahiti.

Current squad
Squad for the 2019-20 Tahiti Ligue 2

Achievements
Tahiti Ligue 1: 7
 1952, 1956, 1957, 1959, 1960, 1986, 1988.

Tahiti Cup: 4
 1960, 1963, 1964, 1965.

Last seasons

References

External links
AS Excelsior Tennis
Facebook Page

Football clubs in Tahiti
Football clubs in French Polynesia